Gordon Ward Gahan (November 5, 1945 – October 19, 1984) was an American photographer.

Biography
Gahan was born at Sloane Hospital for Women in Manhattan, to Alice M. Ward (housewife, age 37), and Edmund Gahan (owner of an oil well supply business, age 48). He attended Harrison High School, where he played on the football team. He attended Phillips Exeter Academy (1959-1963), where he served on the Photographic Boards of the Exonian and the Yearbook. He attended Columbia University (1963-1964). He worked for United Press International (1965-1966), then was drafted into the United States Army, and worked as a photographer in Vietnam during the Vietnam War (1966-1968).

Gahan is best known for his contributions to the National Geographic in the 1970s and 1980s. He began working for the National Geographic Society in 1968 as a contract photographer, and joined the staff in 1972. Assignments took Gahan around the world—to Japan, Kenya, Senegal, Egypt, Israel, Turkey, Greece, Soviet Union, East and West Germany, France, Switzerland, Portugal, England, Canada, United States, Mexico, Brazil, Guatemala, Belize, Panama, Bolivia, Peru, Colombia, Argentina, Australia, New Zealand, Vanuatu, French Polynesia, and Tonga. He left the National Geographic Society in 1982 to co-found Prism Photography Inc., with Martin Rogers and Howie Shneyer, in New York City.

Gahan died in 1984, while taking aerial photographs in the Virgin Islands for a client. He and his assistant, Joseph Capitelli, died along with the pilot when a helicopter crashed near St. Thomas during the photo shoot.

Awards
Gahan's photography has won awards including the 1969 and 1970 Pictures of the Year competition sponsored by the National Press Photographers Association and the University of Missouri School of Journalism.
Gahan's work has been exhibited at the Corcoran Gallery and at Harvard University.
Gahan was introduced to US President Richard Nixon at the White House in 1972.

Published works

National Geographic issues with contributions by Gordon Gahan
The Coming Revolution in Transportation, September 1969, pp. 301–341
The Lights Are Up at Ford’s Theatre, Mar. 1970, pp. 392–401
In Search of Man's Past at Lake Rudolf, May 1970, pp. 712–734
The Exquisite Orchids, Apr. 1971, pp. 484–513
Maui, Where Old Hawaii Still Lives, Apr. 1971, pp. 514–543
Captain Cook: The Man Who Mapped the Pacific, September 1971, pp. 297–349
The More Paris Changes...., July 1972, pp. 64–103
Drought Bedevils Brazil's Sertão, November 1972, pp. 704–723
Israel—The Seventh Day, December 1972, pp. 816–855
This Changing Earth, January 1973, pp. 1–37
France’s Wild, Watery South, the Camargue, May 1973, pp. 696–726
Mexico, the City That Founded a Nation, May 1973, pp. 638–669
East Germany: The Struggle to Succeed, September 1974, pp. 295–329
Queen Elizabeth's Favorite Sea Dog: Sir Francis Drake, February 1975, pp. 216–253
Nova Scotia, the Magnificent Anchorage, March 1975, pp. 334–363
Turkey: Cross Fire at an Ancient Crossroads, July 1977, pp. 88–123
Imperial Russia's Glittering Legacy, January 1978, pp. 24–33
Moscow: The City Around Red Square, January 1978, pp. 2–45
Minoans and Mycenaeans: Greece's Brilliant Bronze Age, February 1978, pp. 142–185*Texas! National Geographic Magazine, Apr. 1980, pp. 440–483
Napoleon, February 1982, pp. 142–189
Santa Fe: Goal at the End of the Trail, March 1982, pp. 322–345

National Geographic Society books with photographs by Gordon Gahan
The Renaissance: Maker of Modern Man, 1970
Great Religions of the World, 1971
A Day in the Woods, 1975
Mysteries of the Ancient World, 1979
Voyages to Paradise: Exploring in the Wake of Captain Cook, 1981

References

Selected bibliography
Michael Kukler, "Mike Garfield and Gordon W. Gahan," National Vietnam Veterans Review, [June 1982?]
"Obituaries: Gordon Gahan, Photographer, Killed in Crash,", ''The Washington Post, October 21, 1984
Jane Livingston. Odyssey: the art of photography at National Geographic. Corcoran Gallery of Art, Washington DC, 1988. Photo on Plate no. 237; bio on p. 352
C.D.B. Bryan. The National Geographic Society: 100 Years of Adventure and Discovery. Abrams, 1997

1945 births
1984 deaths
20th-century American photographers
Columbia University alumni
Phillips Exeter Academy alumni